Podolyak is an East Slavic language surname.
Notable people with the surname include:
 Aleksandr Podolyak (born 1962), former Russian football player
 Ivan Podolyak (born 1990), Russian professional association football player
 Mykhailo Podolyak (born 1972), Ukrainian politician, journalist and negotiator
 Roman Podolyak (born 1993), Ukrainian football defender 

Ukrainian-language surnames
Belarusian-language surnames
Russian-language surnames